The Miami Boys was a drug organization composed of a loose-knit group of African-American drug suppliers and dealers from south Florida (particularly Miami). Also known as "the Untouchables", the group started in the early 1980s and by 1986 the organization had spread to other cities and states throughout the Southeastern United States. 

The Miami Boys was structured like organized crime or paramilitary group, with assigned ranks and sectors of territory ("quadrants"), and weapons such as Soviet AK-47s and Uzi submachine guns.

History 
The Miami Boys were reported in the early 1980s in Southern Florida when drug dealers ("the boys from Miami") traveled northwards. By 1986, the Miami Boys were operating in Atlanta, where an ounce of cocaine sold for triple the Miami price, displacing local small-time dealers. The gang arrived in Jacksonville, Florida in 1986, and members played a large role in that city's crack and heroin trade, until the last remaining Miami Boys dealer, Michael Delancy, was arrested in 1999. The gang was largely eliminated in Atlanta in 1996, as part of the city's efforts to prepare for the 1996 Summer Olympics.

References

Further reading

Organizations established in the 1980s
1980s establishments in Florida
Organizations disestablished in 1996
1996 disestablishments in Georgia (U.S. state)
African-American history of Florida
African-American organized crime groups
Gangs in Florida
Gangs in Georgia (U.S. state)